Li Shuwen (1864–1934) was a master practitioner of the Chinese martial art of Bajiquan.  He was known as "God Spear Li" (神槍李). His prowess was said to be enough that he boasted that he did not have to strike the same opponent twice. He was a martial arts adviser of Fu Zhensong, notably once fighting him to a draw. Li's students eventually became personal bodyguards for Mao Zedong, Chiang Kai-shek, and Henry Pu-Yi.

While not due to malicious intent, Li Shuwen killed many people during his life in either martial arts matches or self defense, causing victims' relatives to hold a grudge. He died of a poisonous tea served by one of them. Regardless, his reputation as one of the world's greatest martial artists persists to this day.

In fiction
Li Shuwen is depicted as a "Servant" character in the Fate franchise, beginning with Fate/Extra.

The Japanese manga "Kenji" depicted Li Shuwen according to numerous accounts from various sources, notably from Li Shuwen's last student Liu Yunqiao.

References 

Chinese martial artists
1864 births
1934 deaths